The 2022 Vanderbilt Commodores baseball team represented Vanderbilt University in the 2022 NCAA Division I baseball season. The Commodores played their home games at Hawkins Field.

Previous season

The Commodores finished 49–18, 19–10 in the SEC to finish in second place in the East division. They hosted the 2021 Nashville Regional and finished 3–0. The Commodores then hosted East Carolina in the Nashville Super Regional, winning the first two games to advance to the College World Series. The Commodores advanced to the Championship Series of the CWS, finishing as Runner-up to Mississippi State.

Schedule and results

Standings

Results

References

Vanderbilt
Vanderbilt Commodores baseball seasons
Vanderbilt Commodores
Vanderbilt